Hagen Kleinert (born 15 June 1941) is professor of theoretical physics at the Free University of Berlin, Germany (since 1968),
Honorary Doctor at the
West University of Timișoara, and
at the
Kyrgyz-Russian Slavic University
in Bishkek. He is also
Honorary Member of the
Russian Academy of Creative Endeavors. For his contributions to particle and solid state physics he was awarded the Max Born Prize 2008 with Medal.
His contribution to the memorial volume celebrating the 100th birthday of Lev Davidovich Landau earned him the Majorana Prize 2008 with Medal. He is married to Dr. Annemarie Kleinert since 1974 with whom he has a son Michael Kleinert.

Publications
Kleinert has written ~420 papers on mathematical physics and the physics of elementary particles, nuclei, solid state systems, liquid crystals, biomembranes, microemulsions, polymers, and the theory of financial markets. He has written several books on theoretical physics, the most notable of which, Path Integrals in Quantum Mechanics, Statistics, Polymer Physics, and Financial Markets, has been published in five editions since 1990 and has received enthusiastic reviews.

Education
He studied physics at the Leibniz University Hannover between 1960 and 1963, and at several American universities including Georgia Institute of Technology, where he learned general relativity as a graduate student from George Gamow, one of the fathers of the Big Bang theory.
Kleinert earned his doctorate in 1967 at the University of Colorado, Boulder.

Career
As a young professor in 1972, Kleinert visited Caltech and was impressed by noted US physicist Richard Feynman.  Later, Kleinert was to collaborate with Feynman in some of the latter's last work.
This collaboration led to a mathematical method for converting divergent weak-coupling power series into convergent strong-coupling ones. This so-called variational perturbation theory yields at present the most accurate theory of critical exponents
observable close to second-order phase transitions, as confirmed for superfluid helium in satellite experiments. He also discovered an alternative to Feynman's time-sliced path integral construction which can be used to solve the path integral formulations of the hydrogen atom and the centrifugal barrier, i.e. to calculate their energy levels and eigenstates, as special cases of a general strategy for treating systems with singular potentials using path integrals.

Within the quantum field theories of quarks
he found the origin of the algebra of Regge residues conjectured by N. Cabibbo, L. Horwitz, and
Y. Ne'eman (see p. 232 in reference).

Discoveries
For superconductors he predicted in 1982 a tricritical point in the phase diagram between type-I and type-II superconductors where the order of the transition changes from second to first. The predictions were confirmed in 2002 by Monte Carlo computer simulations.

The theory is based on a disorder field theory dual to the order field theory of L.D. Landau for phase transitions which Kleinert developed in the books on Gauge Fields in Condensed Matter. In this theory, the statistical properties of fluctuating vortex or defect lines are described as elementary excitations with the help of fields, whose Feynman diagrams are the pictures of the lines.

At the 1978 summer school in Erice he proposed the existence of broken supersymmetry in atomic nuclei, which has since been observed experimentally.

His theory of collective quantum fields and the Hadronization of Quark Theories are prototypes for numerous developments in the theory of condensed matter, nuclear and elementary particle physics.

Together with K. Maki he proposed and clarified in 1981 a possible icosahedral phase of quasicrystals.
This structure was discovered three years later in aluminum transition metal alloys by Dan Shechtman, which earned him the
Nobel Prize 2011.

In 2006, he considered the existence of a novel Riemann particle. The experimental verification is still missing.

See historical notes.

String theory contributions
In 1986 he introduced stiffness into the theory of strings,
which had formerly been characterized by tension alone. This greatly improved the description of the physical properties of strings. The Russian physicist A. Polyakov
simultaneously proposed a similar extension, and so the model is now known as the Polyakov-Kleinert string .

Theory of distributions
Together with A. Chervyakov, Kleinert developed an extension of the theory of distributions from linear spaces to semigroups by defining their products uniquely (in the mathematical theory, only linear combinations are defined). The extension is motivated by the physical requirement that the corresponding path integrals must be invariant under coordinate transformations, which is necessary for the equivalence of the path integral formulation to Schrödinger theory.

String theory alternative
As an alternative to string theory, Kleinert used the complete analogy between non-Euclidean geometry and the geometry of crystals with defects to construct a model of the universe called the World Crystal or Planck-Kleinert crystal.  In this model, matter creates defects in spacetime which generate curvature. This curvature reproduces all the effects of general relativity, but leads to different physics than string theory at the scale of the Planck length. This theory inspired Italian artist Laura Pesce to create glass sculptures entitled "world crystal" (see also lower left on this page).

Current work
Kleinert is a senior member of the faculty for the International Relativistic Astrophysics PhD (IRAP) Project, which forms part of the international network for astrophysics (ICRANet). He was also involved in the European Science Foundation's project Cosmology in the Laboratory.

Kleinert's 60th birthday was honored by a Festschrift and a Festcolloquium with 65 contributions by international colleagues (for instance Y. Ne'eman, R. Jackiw, H. Fritzsch, R. Ruffini, C. DeWitt, L. Kauffman, J. Devreese, and K. Maki).

See also
Path integral molecular dynamics
Resummation

Books 
 Gauge Fields in Condensed Matter, Vol. I,  " SUPERFLOW AND VORTEX LINES", pp. 1–742, Vol. II,  "STRESSES AND DEFECTS", pp. 743–1456,  World Scientific (Singapore, 1989); Paperback   (also available online: Vol. I and Vol. II)
 Critical Properties of φ4-Theories, World Scientific (Singapore, 2001); Paperback  (also available online) (together with V. Schulte-Frohlinde)
 Path Integrals in Quantum Mechanics, Statistics, Polymer Physics, and Financial Markets, 5th edition, World Scientific (Singapore, 2009) (also available online)
 Multivalued Fields in Condensed Matter, Electrodynamics, and Gravitation,  World Scientific (Singapore, 2008) (also available online)
 Proceedings of the Eleventh Marcel Grossmann Meeting on General Relativity,  World Scientific (Singapore, 2008) (together with R.T. Jantzen)
 Particles and Quantum Fields,  World Scientific (Singapore, 2016) (also available online)

References

External links 
 Personal homepage

1941 births
Living people
People from Twardogóra
People from the Province of Lower Silesia
20th-century German physicists
University of Hanover alumni
Georgia Tech alumni
Academic staff of the Free University of Berlin
21st-century German physicists